Jean-Claude Malépart (3 December 1938 – 16 November 1989) was a French Canadian politician.

Born in Montreal, Quebec, the son of Charles-Auguste Malépart and Germaine Mérineau, Malépart was elected to the National Assembly of Quebec in the riding of Sainte-Marie in the 1973 election, after losing the 1970 election. He was defeated in the 1976 election.

A member of the House of Commons of Canada representing the ridings of Sainte-Marie (later Montreal—Sainte-Marie), and Laurier—Sainte-Marie, he was elected in the 1979, 1980, 1984, and 1988 federal elections. A Liberal, he was the Parliamentary Secretary to the Minister of Public Works from 1982 to 1984.

His daughter Nathalie Malépart ran as the Liberal Party of Quebec candidate in a 2006 by-election in the riding of Sainte-Marie–Saint-Jacques. She lost to the Parti Québécois candidate, Martin Lemay.

Malépart died in Montreal in 1989 and is buried in the Notre Dame des Neiges Cemetery.

Electoral record (partial)

References
 
 

1938 births
1989 deaths
Liberal Party of Canada MPs
Members of the House of Commons of Canada from Quebec
Politicians from Montreal
Quebec Liberal Party MNAs
Burials at Notre Dame des Neiges Cemetery